The Born This Way Ball was the third concert tour by American singer Lady Gaga, in support of her second studio album Born This Way (2011). The tour visited all continents, except Antarctica, and was ranked as the fifth highest-grossing tour of 2012 by Pollstar. The tour grossed $22.5 million in 2013 according to Pollstar's year-end chart from the 18 dates played, bringing the Born This Way Ball Tour's total gross to $183.9 million from 98 dates. The tour was well received by critics who praised the stage design, Gaga's vocal abilities and different expressive messages.

On February 13, 2013, after already announcing the postponement of shows in Chicago, Detroit, and Hamilton two days earlier due to an injury, Live Nation and Lady Gaga announced the cancellation of the remaining concert dates due to the singer's development of a labral tear of the right hip caused by strenuous repetitive movements involved in the shows. The singer went through surgery to fix the damage caused.

Background and development

During the release of "Judas", the second single from Born This Way, Lady Gaga confirmed in an interview that she would embark on a concert tour in 2012, which would visit Latin American countries for the first time, like Brazil, and would return to Mexico. In November 2011, producer DJ White Shadow asserted that Gaga was "doing [preparations] for the next round of touring", adding that the singer's main objective in the following year was to continue preparing for the Born This Way Ball, as well as create new songs for her next studio album. Fernando Garibay, who began collaborating with Gaga in The Fame Monster (2009), felt that Born This Way was one of his most personal moments. He opined, "This album was the most personal [because of] the amount of detail that went into this record, the amount of passion [and] emotion from her and the team. Every song was a story towards the Born This Way theme. We're excited now, putting that into the tour and expressing that on a live performance level." In contrast to her previous tour, Garibay affirmed that the shows of the Born This Way Ball would be more exaggerated.

A promotional poster of the tour was released on February 7, 2012, which was described by Billboard Ray Waddell as a "bizarre poster that portrays the ball as a campy, medieval-meets-the-80's kingdom." It features Gaga's face hovering over dark clouds looking down from the sky, and includes touches of neon purple and turquoise coloring. She is also fused into a keytar, standing near her dancers in front of a medieval castle. The first and second legs for the Born This Way Ball were announced the following day, revealing that Gaga would perform concerts in countries such as South Korea, Hong Kong, and Singapore. Additional dates as part of the Australasia leg were added on February 15, 2012. Live Nation Global Touring CEO Arthur Fogel and his team will steer around the tour, as they did the bulk of the Monster Ball tour of 2010–11. Fogel explained that "The last tour established [Gaga] as a major act worldwide and I believe this tour will be an extension of that, particularly considering we're going to territories she's never been in, like Southeast Asia and Latin America."

A European leg was announced in March 2012, which consisted of twenty-one dates over a period of two months, initiating in Bulgaria while concluding in Spain. Subsequently, German electronic musician Zedd was declared as an opening act for the Asian leg of the tour, while longtime collaborator Lady Starlight and British glam rock band The Darkness were approached as opening acts for the European portion of the Born This Way Ball. In their website, the band stated that they were "honoured to announce their addition to the bill as main support for Lady Gaga's Born This Way Ball tour 2012." Dates for Latin America were announced on August 6, 2012 via Twitter. There were two dates in North America and four in South America, with more to be added.

Gaga evaluated the tour as an "electro-metal pop-opera"; "the tale of the Beginning, the genesis of the Kingdom of Fame. How we were birthed and how we will die celebrating." Dance rehearsals occurred for approximately one month. In February 2012, she revealed that she would release stage designs for the Born This Way Ball via Twitter. Gaga unveiled a sketch of the stage design, which was designed by the singer herself and her creative team Haus of Gaga. Gaga tweeted: "I'm so excited. The Haus has been working so hard, we can't wait for you to see it!! Love you Little Monsters, have the time of your life." The stage was completed over a period of a few months, and was modeled after a medieval Gothic castle, featuring viewing towers, intricate carvings and a large catwalk to interact with the audience. It took over fifteen trailers—which measured fifty-three feet in length—to move the castle onto the stage.  The area enclosed by the catwalk was described by Gaga as "The Monster Pit". "The Monster Pit is General Admission only, and Little Monsters [...] unlock it when they arrive to the arena or stadium. Entry to The Monster Pit is relegated [...] to the fans who have arrived first, waited all night, [...] dressed to 'Ball.' Every night Haus of Gaga will choose fans from The Monster Pit to come back stage and meet me! These tickets are not more expensive. No dress code requirement. Born This Way means anything goes."

As part of an advertising campaign in the weeks proceeding to the tour, sketches of four costumes designed by Giorgio Armani were released to the press. Armani previously contributed attires to Gaga at the 52nd Annual Grammy Awards, and again during her endeavors on the Monster Ball Tour. Many other outtfits were provided by Donatella Versace for the tour.

Concert synopsis

The show is set in and around a large medieval style castle, known as the "Kingdom of Fame" which rotates and manoeuvres throughout the show. A classical score accompanies the show's interludes, tying in with the show's dark, operatic theme. The show began with "Highway Unicorn (Road to Love)" accompanied by an extended intro, which Gaga performed while atop a fully puppeteer-ed horse, with a mechanical look, built by The Jim Henson Company, out of the three-story medieval castle prop. After the song, the stage went dark and spotlights were shone across the stage with a helicopter sound being played. The audience then hears "Mother G.O.A.T." speak for the first time stating that "alien fugitive Lady Gaga has escaped" and that "Operation: Kill the Bitch", is in order. Gaga comes out in an alien costume and sings "Government Hooker", in which she "seduces" a dancer who is dressed in a suit before killing him and leaving the stage. Gaga's dancers then reenact the birth scene akin to that in "Born This Way", as the singer moans and simulates giving birth after coming out of the zipper-like vagina of a large, inflatable body.

After "Black Jesus + Amen Fashion" and "Bloody Mary" an interlude commences and recites the opening dialogue of the music video of "Born This Way". For "Bad Romance", Gaga arrives on the stage inside a vessel. Following the song, she escapes to the top of the castle and sings "Judas", before escaping and performing "Fashion of His Love" and "Just Dance". During "LoveGame", a clear bathtub built on the stage inside which it is sung. After a speech from Gaga, thanking the audience for coming to her show, "Telephone" is performed with the original choreography. An interlude follows, with Mother G.O.A.T. describing "Gaga's take over of planet earth". "Heavy Metal Lover" is performed next and Gaga appears laying atop across the body of a motor-"tricycle" with her arms in two slots, a recreation of the album cover. Gaga drives around the Monster Pit followed by choreography for the last chorus of the song. After "Bad Kids" an acoustic section follows with songs like "Hair", "Princess Die" and "You and I". The section concludes with "Electric Chapel" with a display of flashing lights before Gaga leaves the stage.

After a Spanish guitar intro, she then returns in a recreation of her meat dress and performs "Americano". "Poker Face" is performed next and at the end of the song Gaga is lowered into a meat grinder. A moment later she emerges from the stage sitting on a meat couch and performs "Alejandro" with her gun bra and green trousers. The castle closes along an interlude and blue lights. Mother G.O.A.T. flies around the castle lip-syncing the words to the first verse of "Paparazzi" until Gaga returns to kill her with her new disco stick. Gaga then gives a speech about how there are no boundaries in music, and then performs "Scheiße". After the song the stage goes black. Moments later she returns in a tower singing "The Edge of Glory" and the last song, "Marry the Night". When the song ends, she and her dancers are lowered off stage and the castle goes dark.

Critical response

Asia and Oceania

The Korea Herald journalist Cho Chung-un opined that Gaga captivated the audience with what he described as an "innovative and breathtaking stage installations and ideas" in the tour. Writing for the same publication, Emma Kalka complemented Gaga's wardrobe, and cited several segments, such as her "Americano" performance, as highlights of the concert. To Kwaak Je-yup of The Korea Times, the performance demonstrated Gaga's abilities as a performing artist. "Friday night was Lady Gaga at her best, fusing fashion and designs with great melodies and dance moves."

A writer for MTV noted the elaborate visuals of the show with its "Gothic castle backdrop and myriad costume changes" concluding that it is "clear that Gaga has outdone even her own Monster Ball in terms of spectacle." Elizabeth Soh of Yahoo! gave a positive review of the Singapore concert describing it as "at times shocking, raunchy, mellow and just plain bizarre." The New Zealand Herald felt that it was "obvious Gaga believes in her message, you can feel it in her voice. [That] Behind all the lights, glitz, meat, guns and exploding bras is a singer of exceptional talent". Regarding her first show in Brisbane, the Brisbane Times gave it five stars, writing that it was "pure pop theatre" and that "the crowd was simply lost in the Gaga experience. Sean Sennet of The Australian commented that the show was "An extravaganza in every sense" and will be "remembered as a benchmark tour."

Simon Sweetman of New Zealand's Stuff.co.nz praised the tour's Auckland date as the best pop concert since Janet Jackson's Velvet Rope Tour. South African publication The New Age gave Gaga's performance in Johannesburg five stars, stating that "Gaga's energy teamed with a bevy of spectacular dancers made for an electric show".
National newspaper The Timess Nikita Ramkissoon shared this praise, writing that she "was really taken by was her natural talent... From arriving on stage on a horse, birthing herself, dancing dripping with sex and magnificence, Black Jesus and legs splayed open on an armchair made of meat, this performance was nothing short of spectacular. Every minute of it... Everyone [she] know who was there was blown away. You just had to be there to see how impressive it was".

Europe
The Born This Way Ball was labelled as the "best show of the year" and "one of the most amazing events in years in Lithuania" by Lithuanian publication ATN. Neil McCormick of The Daily Telegraph awarded the Born This Way Ball in Helsinki four stars, writing that the show "is quite spectacular... and quite spectacularly bonkers", mentioning that Gaga "occupies pole position as the 21st centuries ultimate pop star". Swedish news corporation Expressen gave the show five stars, believing that "her two and a half hour show is by far the most lavish and eccentric [they'd] ever seen", complementing Gaga's "flashes of humour... and smart political digs", and the show's intimacy and promotion of self-expression and love. The Guardian gave the show four out of five stars, stating that "The tightly choreographed hits sound terrific, but it's when this curious star sabotages the slickness that she seems most herself". Regarding her performance at the O2 World in Berlin, Berliner Morgenpost reported that "unlike Madonna, whose artificial spectacle you could experience at the same place, the younger rival is cheeky, fresh, uncompromising". Norwegian newspaper Verdens Gang gave it a mixed review, admiring her voice, but saying that "if we are going to talk about content, it is similar [to Madonna's]. Gaga hardly says anything Madonna didn't say 25 years ago" adding that "But I have a feeling that she is a less interesting pop-artist than many of us had hoped for. Lady Gaga so often praised for being "original", is mostly very un-original."

North America

Reviews of the North American leg were mostly positive. The Vancouver Suns François Marchand praised the show, writing that "Unlike Madonna, whose latest Vancouver appearance was dominated by violent imagery and a borderline bullying attitude toward her longtime fans, Gaga continued to carry her trademark message of empowerment and self-love". Jeva Lange of the Seattle Weekly review of the Tacoma show paralleled the praise given to the Vancouver shows, believing that "her voice, costumes, and lyrical honestly were not only completely unforgettable, they were inspiring". Rich Lopez from Dallas Voice praised the show and Lady Gaga's "relentlessness in giving a dynamic performance", saying "She shocked, she touched, she served diva realness, and like those four fans onstage (as well as the ones who joined her in the "Marry the Night" finale), she made everyone feel special." The Arizona Republics Joe Golfen also gave the Phoenix show a positive review, stating that "The nearly two-and-a-half hour show, a stop on her worldwide Born This Way Ball, highlighted everything that has made Lady Gaga such a phenomenon. There were outrageous outfits, elaborate set pieces, sexy dance numbers, and messages of self-respect and gay rights. Plus, all those hit songs.", and noting "that packed arena of screaming fans made it clear that her star wasn't going to be fading away anytime soon."

Other North American reviews were more critical. Emily Zemler of The Hollywood Reporter gave the Los Angeles show a mixed review, writing: "The music was, at best, secondary to the grab-bag, highly produced performance... It was almost as though the singer decided to indulge every possible idea anyone ever had for her live show simultaneously". Jim Harrington from Oakland Tribune gave the San Jose concert a negative review, saying that the "production is so over-the-top that it completely buries the music", adding that "the level of enthusiasm [of the fans] definitely seemed to peak early in the concert."

Commercial performance

Tickets for the tour ignited tremendous commercial success in several Asian and Australian markets. Tickets for the Australasian leg of the Born This Way Ball became available on February 17, 2012 through Ticketek and Ticketmaster. Shortly after availability, tickets for the initial two Auckland shows were sold out. In response to positive ticket sales in New Zealand and Australia, nine additional concerts were scheduled as part of the Australasia leg. In Hong Kong, an estimated 6,000 presale tickets became available on February 24. Tickets were sold out within three hours, prompting Live Nation to add three extra concerts in the city in five days. Additional sellouts and positive commercial results were reported for the successive performances in Hong Kong, as well as in Taipei, Tokyo, Bangkok, Singapore, Seoul, and Jakarta, with the latter having sold out within two hours.

Similar successes were echoed in European markets. Several British publications indicated that presale tickets in the United Kingdom were selling beyond the demand. Industry analysts suggested that based on internet searches that an estimated two million people could attempt to purchase a ticket out of the 75,000 that were issued for the London and Manchester dates. Tickets became available for general sale on April 13, 2012; the London event sold out in a record-breaking 50 seconds, while the Manchester concert sold out under ten minutes.
Several European ticketing sites crashed when the tickets went on sale, including Sweden, Finland and Spain, where the Barcelona pre-sale fastly sold out; more than 22,000 people attended her outdoor concert in Bucharest, Romania. Both Russian dates sold out in hours. So far the biggest crowd on the tour has been in Paris at the Stade de France on September 22, 2012, when Gaga, with 71,000 people in attendance, became the youngest artist to ever grace the stadium until Rihanna scheduled a date at the Stade de France on her Diamonds World Tour for June 2013.

The high demand for tickets continued in Africa. When tickets went on sale for the two dates in South Africa, the ticket retailer Computicket's online ticketing servers crashed under the pressure from the high volume of fans trying to buy tickets to the concerts. Before the crash, some fans experienced extremely long waiting times in online queues, up to two hours, and at one point it was reported that over 26,000 people were still waiting to purchase tickets online. As a result, Computicket decided to cease online ticket sale until the following morning.

Despite the worldwide commercial success of the tour, it was not very well received by the South American market. In Colombia, some tickets were sold at half of their original price to increase ticket sales. This generated a wide criticism from fans who bought tickets at the original price; the production company also made an offer to fans who bought tickets at their original price, so they could get another free ticket in the same location and a price adjusted refund, or a full refund. To increase ticket sales of the three concerts in Brazil, special offers were made; one to include a two-for-one in some stand locations, and a ten-installments-with-no-interest payment for tickets. In Chile, ticket sales were higher than in the rest of the South American countries. However, the show was not able to sell all the locations immediately, and the production company for the concert had to make special offers two weeks before the show to sell more tickets. This included a 2x1 offer in stand locations, and reducing the price in most of the tickets. In Peru, tickets were sold in the original price.

The North American leg of the tour additionally experienced strong ticket sales. By the time the final 21 dates of the tour had been canceled on February 13, the entire leg had been nearly sold out. Had the entire leg been completed, the tour would have topped $200 million in ticket sales and finished as one of the top fifteen highest-grossing tours of all time. The cancellation of the last 21 dates resulted in refunds of over $25 million and 200,000 tickets.
With more than twenty dates left, Gaga was forced to cancel the remaining tour dates due to sustaining a hip injury that required surgery. With the dates of the tour that were successfully completed, Gaga grossed more than $160 million.

Controversies

The South Asian part of the tour was the subject of some controversy due to its denunciation by social conservatives. Gaga's support for LGBT rights, the supposed indecency of her shows, and religious content in her lyrics led some conservative Christian and Muslim groups in South Korea, the Philippines, and Indonesia to call for the cancellation of the concerts. Most went on as scheduled, although one, in Indonesia, was canceled due to threats, the cancellation being seen as an indicator of the growing influence of conservative groups like the Islamic Defenders Front.

Several conservative political commentators denounced The Born This Way Ball shortly after the conception of the tour. In May 2012, Gaga sparked an online uproar, particularly in the city of Bangkok when she tweeted: "I just landed in Bangkok baby! Ready for 50,000 screaming Thai monsters. I wanna get lost in a lady market and buy fake Rolex."  Several of Gaga's fans felt that the tweet was racist and viewed it as a negative stereotype. The following month, weeks after her concert in Thailand, several members of the country filed a public lawsuit against Gaga for misuse of the Thailand flag. The complaints came from when Gaga while wearing an accessorized and provocative bikini costume with and a traditional Thai headdress, rode a motorcycle across the stage with a Thai flag tied to it. Government officials in the country deemed the act as "not appropriate" and felt that it "hurt the feelings of Thai People".

Gaga caused more controversy after her performance of June 27 in Melbourne, where she debuted a new song called "Princess Die", about suicide and mental illness. The song's lyrics, including lines such as "I wish that I was strong/I wish that I was wrong/I wish that I could cope/but I took pills and left a note" were slammed as "distasteful" by suicide charities, who feared the message about the suicide that the song portrayed. Chris Wagner of Lifeline, an international crisis support service, stated, "Lifeline is very concerned about the nature of the song, particularly as it clearly describes the method of suicide and talks in depth about suicide. It doesn't actually have any message of hope, of help seeking, or anything of a positive nature whatsoever." The song's references to Diana, Princess of Wales and her death also caused offense and outrage, despite Gaga attempting to distance herself from such controversy by clearly spelling out the name of the song during her concert.

Set list
This set list is representative of the first show in Los Angeles. It does not represent all dates throughout the tour.

 "Highway Unicorn (Road to Love)"
 "Government Hooker"
 "Born This Way"
 "Black Jesus + Amen Fashion"
 "Bloody Mary"
 "Bad Romance"
 "Judas"
 "Fashion of His Love"
 "Just Dance"
 "LoveGame"
 "Telephone"
 "Hair"
 "Electric Chapel"
 "Heavy Metal Lover"
 "Bad Kids"
 "The Queen"
 "You and I"
 "Americano"
 "Poker Face"
 "Alejandro"
 "Paparazzi"
 "Scheiße"
Encore
 "The Edge of Glory"
 "Marry the Night"

Shows

Cancelled shows

Personnel
Credits adapted from the tour's official program.

Main

Visual Director – Richard Jackson
Art Director – Marla Weinhoff
Production Executive – Mo Morrison
Stage Architect – Mark Fisher
Fashion Director – Nicola Formichetti
Costume Design – Haus of Gaga, Christian Dada, Armani, Versace, Moschino, and Void of Course
Creative – Haus of Gaga, Lady Gaga, Josh Thomas and Richard Jackson
Choreographer – Richard Jackson
Wardrobe – Perry Meek and Tony Villanueva
Stylist – Brandon Maxwell
Hair Stylist – Frederic Aspiras
Make Up – Tara Savelo and Sara Nicole Tanno
Video Director – Steven Fatone
Lighting Director – Calvin Mosier
Management – Troy Carter
Stage Director – Richard Jackson
Stage Fabrication – Tait Towers
Promoter – Live Nation Global Touring
Dancers – Amanda Balen, David Lei Brandt, Graham Breitenstein, Montana Efaw, Kevin Frey, Knicole Haggins, Asiel Hardison, Jeremy Hudson, Mark Kanemura, Ian McKenzie, Sloan-Taylor Rabinor, and Victor Rojas

Band

Lady Gaga – Lead vocals, piano, keytar, guitar
Lanar "Kern" Brantley – Bass, Band Leader
George "Spanky" McCurdy – Drums
Brockett Parsons – Keyboards
Tim Stewart – Guitar
Ricky Tillo – Guitar
Joe Wilson – Musical director

Notes

References

External links

Lady Gaga Official Website

2012 concert tours
2013 concert tours
Lady Gaga concert tours
Concert tours of North America
Concert tours of Europe
Concert tours of Oceania
Concert tours of South America
Concert tours of Asia
Concert tours of Africa
Concert tours of South Korea
Concert tours of Hong Kong
Concert tours of Japan
Concert tours of Taiwan
Concert tours of the Philippines
Concert tours of Thailand
Concert tours of Singapore
Concert tours of New Zealand
Concert tours of Australia
Concert tours of Austria
Concert tours of Estonia
Concert tours of Finland
Concert tours of Sweden
Concert tours of Denmark
Concert tours of Germany
Concert tours of the United Kingdom
Concert tours of Ireland
Concert tours of the Netherlands
Concert tours of France
Concert tours of Switzerland
Concert tours of Belgium
Concert tours of Italy
Concert tours of Spain
Concert tours of Mexico
Concert tours of South Africa
Concert tours of Norway
Concert tours of Russia
Concert tours of Canada
Concert tours of the United States